"You Spin Me Round (Like a Record)" is a song by English pop band Dead or Alive, featured on their second album, Youthquake (1985). Released as a single in November 1984, it reached No. 1 in the UK in March 1985, taking 17 weeks to get there. It was the first UK number-one hit by the Stock Aitken Waterman production trio. On the U.S. Billboard Hot 100, it peaked at No. 11 on 17 August of that year.

In 2003, Q ranked the song at number 981 in their list of the "1001 Best Songs Ever", Blender listed it at number 289 on its ranking of "Greatest Songs Since You Were Born" in 2005 and in 2015, it was voted by the British public as the nation's 17th favourite 1980s number-one in a poll for ITV.

Background and composition
Dead or Alive's vocalist Pete Burns stated in his autobiography that he composed "You Spin Me Round" by using two existing songs as inspiration for creating something new:

Desiring to move on from the sound of the band's first album, Sophisticated Boom Boom (1984), Pete Burns wanted "You Spin Me Round" to be produced by the then little-known production team Stock Aitken Waterman, in the Hi-NRG style of their 1984 UK hits "You Think You're a Man" by Divine, and "Whatever I Do (Wherever I Go)" by Hazell Dean.

Burns claimed the song was "completed" by the time the producers were then chosen to work on it, stating that "the record companies don't trust a band to go into the studio without a producer". According to Burns, the record company was unenthusiastic about "You Spin Me Round" to such an extent that Burns had to take out a £2,500 loan to record it. After it was recorded, he recalled, "the record company said it was awful" and the band had to fund production of the song's video themselves.

Interviewed for BBC Radio 4's The Reunion: The Hit Factory, in April 2015, Burns said that a confrontational attitude between the producers and band led to "quite a bad vibe" during production and "a time of intense friction". Engineer Phil Harding, who mixed the track, said tensions were running so high between the band members and producers Mike Stock and Matt Aitken during mixing, that it almost escalated to violence. Aitken has confirmed that tensions were high, with the producers clashing with band members over the latter's desire to keep adding new elements to the mix. Stock has disputed the seriousness of studio tensions, alleging that Burns, Harding and Pete Waterman have all "exaggerated" what happened in their recounting of events.

"You Spin Me Round (Like a Record)" is written in the key of F♯ minor.

Re-releases
A remix version of "You Spin Me Round" was released in 2003 at the same time Dead or Alive's greatest hits album Evolution: The Hits was released. The song reached No. 23 in the UK Singles Chart. The original 1984 recording was re-released on 30 January 2006 because of lead singer Pete Burns's controversial time as a contestant on television series Celebrity Big Brother and reached no. 5.

Earlier remixes were in 1996 and 1997 (some are included on the US, European and Australian releases of Nukleopatra). In 1999 these mixes were issued in the US as a 2-CD set. The first disc held seven mixes of "You Spin Me Round" while disc two has five mixes of "Sex Drive". In 2000, new mixes appeared on Fragile and in 2001, on Unbreakable: The Fragile Remixes.

Chart performance
The song has been re-released three times since its original release in 1984. Each time of its release, it achieved success, but failed to match the success of the original. However, after lead-singer Pete Burns's appearance on Celebrity Big Brother in 2006, the single was re-released and managed a Top 5 peak on the UK Singles Chart.

According to Burns, 12-inch singles comprised over 70% of the original sales of "You Spin Me Round", and because these were regarded by the record label as promotional tools rather than sales, the band had to threaten legal action against the label before they received the royalties on them.

Music video
The accompanying music video, which features a disco ball, waving gold flags and an evocation of the six-armed deity Vishnu, was directed by Vaughan Arnell and Anthea Benton.

Impact and legacy
In 2003, British popular music magazine Q ranked "You Spin Me Round (Like a Record)" number 981 in their list of the "1001 Best Songs Ever".

In 2005, Blender listed it at number 289 on its ranking of "Greatest Songs Since You Were Born".

In 2015, it was voted by the British public as the nation's 17th favourite 1980s number-one in a poll for ITV.

After the death of Burns in 2016, musician and actor Gary Kemp described the song as "one of the best white dance records of all time."

In 2020, The Guardian ranked the song number five in their list of "The 100 Greatest UK No 1s".

In 2021, Classic Pop ranked it number-one in their list of "Top 40 Stock Aitken Waterman songs".

Track listing

1985, Epic – 49-05208; 1989, Epic – 49H69181
"You Spin Me Round (Like a Record)" (Murder Mix) – 8:00
"Misty Circles" (Extended Version) – 9:10

1997, Epic – 49-78588
"You Spin Me Round (Like a Record)" (Murder Mix) – 8:00
"Brand New Lover" – 9:10

1999, Cleopatra – CLP 0533-2
CD1
"You Spin Me Round (Like a Record)" (Sugar Pumpers Radio Edit) – 3:38
"You Spin Me Round (Like a Record)" (Cleopatra Radio Edit) – 4:13
"You Spin Me Round (Like a Record)" (Marc Antonine Radio Edit) – 3:21
"You Spin Me Round (Like a Record)" (Sugar Pumpers Extended Mix) – 5:11
"You Spin Me Round (Like a Record)" (Sugar Pumpers Pumpin Mix) – 7:05
"You Spin Me Round (Like a Record)" (Vicious Mix) – 8:10
"You Spin Me Round (Like a Record)" (Marc Antonine Club Mix) – 7:00

CD2
"Sex Drive" (Radio Edit) – 2:52
"Sex Drive" (Scream Driven Edit) – 3:54
"Sex Drive" (Dead or Alive Original Mix) – 6:39
"Sex Drive" (Scream Driven Mix) – 6:59
"Sex Drive" (Pee Wee Remix) – 5:56

2003, Epic 673578 2
"You Spin Me Round (Like a Record)" (Metro 7" Edit) – 3:46
"You Spin Me Round (Like a Record)" (Metro 12" Extended Mix) – 6:55
"You Spin Me Round (Like a Record)" (Punx Soundcheck Vs Princess Julia) – 5:47
"You Spin Me Round (Like a Record)" (Original 7" Mix) – 3:16

2006, Epic 82876 806212
"You Spin Me Round (Like a Record)" (Original 7" Mix) – 3:16
"You Spin Me Round (Like a Record)" (Performance Mix) – 7:27 
"You Spin Me Round (Like a Record)" (Metro 7" Edit) – 3:46
Video: "You Spin Me Round (Like A Record)" – 3:44

Charts

Weekly charts

Year-end charts

Sales and certifications

Dope version

Nu metal band Dope covered the song on their 1999 album Felons and Revolutionaries; the cover also appeared on the soundtrack for the film American Psycho. This version reached no. 37 on the Hot Mainstream Rock Tracks chart.

Track listing

Charts

Jessica Simpson version
Jessica Simpson's version of the song was released as a promo single from her fifth studio album A Public Affair in 2006. Her version of the song failed to break into the Billboard Hot 100 (though it did reach no. 20 on the Bubbling Under Hot 100 Singles). Simpson's version has new lyrics and only preserves the chorus of the song.

Charts

Other cover versions
Mexican singer Thalía covers the song on her 2002 self-titled album. 

In 2007, Danzel released his version of "You Spin Me Round" which peaked at No. 32 in Belgium.

Flo Rida's 2009 single "Right Round" featuring Kesha, interpolates elements of the song.

In 2020, American industrial metal band 3Teeth released Guns Akimbo, a two-track set that included a cover version of "You Spin Me Round (Like a Record)". The song was previously featured in the 2019 action comedy film Guns Akimbo.

See also
List of number-one singles of 1985 (Canada)
List of number-one singles of 1985 (Ireland)
List of number-one hits of 1985 (Switzerland)
List of UK Singles Chart number ones of the 1980s

References

External links

1984 songs
1984 singles
1985 singles
2003 singles
2006 singles
Dead or Alive (band) songs
Epic Records singles
Jessica Simpson songs
Music videos directed by Vaughan Arnell
Irish Singles Chart number-one singles
Number-one singles in Scotland
Number-one singles in Switzerland
RPM Top Singles number-one singles
UK Singles Chart number-one singles
Song recordings produced by Stock Aitken Waterman
Songs written by Pete Burns
Songs written by Tim Lever
Songs written by Mike Percy (musician)
Songs written by Wayne Hussey